Reflections is a career-spanning 3-CD box set by British singer-songwriter Graham Nash including solo material, highlights from groups including The Hollies and various permutations of Crosby, Stills, Nash & Young, and previously unreleased tracks.

The release was compiled by Nash, who also compiled box sets for David Crosby and Stephen Stills.

Track listing
Disc one:

"On a Carousel" (Mono) – The Hollies
"Carrie Anne" (Mono) – The Hollies
"King Midas in Reverse" (Mono) – The Hollies
"Marrakesh Express" – Crosby, Stills & Nash
"Pre-Road Downs" – Crosby, Stills & Nash
"Lady of the Island" – Crosby, Stills & Nash
"Our House" – Crosby, Stills, Nash & Young
"Teach Your Children" (Previously unreleased mix) – Crosby, Stills, Nash & Young
"Right Between the Eyes" (Previously unreleased version) – Graham Nash
"I Used to Be a King" (Previously unreleased mix) – Graham Nash
"Simple Man" (Previously unreleased mix) – Graham Nash
"Man in the Mirror" (Previously unreleased mix) – Graham Nash
"Better Days" (Previously unreleased mix) – Graham Nash
"Military Madness" (Previously unreleased mix) – Graham Nash
"Sleep Song" (Previously unreleased mix) – Graham Nash
"Chicago / We Can Change the World" (Previously unreleased mix) – Graham Nash
"Southbound Train" – Crosby/Nash
"Immigration Man" – Crosby/Nash
"Wild Tales" (Previously unreleased mix) – Graham Nash
"Prison Song" (Previously unreleased mix) – Graham Nash
"Oh! Camil (The Winter Soldier)" (Previously unreleased mix) – Graham Nash
"On the Line" (Previously unreleased mix) – Graham Nash
"You’ll Never Be the Same" (Previously unreleased mix) – Graham Nash
"Another Sleep Song" (Previously unreleased mix) – Graham Nash

Disc two: 
"To the Last Whale" – Crosby/Nash
"Fieldworker" – Crosby/Nash
"Cowboy of Dreams" – Crosby/Nash
"Love Work Out" – Crosby/Nash
"Marguerita" – Crosby/Nash
"Taken at All" (Previously unreleased mix) – Crosby, Stills, Nash & Young
"Mutiny" – Crosby/Nash
"Just a Song Before I Go" – Crosby, Stills & Nash
"Cold Rain" (Previously unreleased mix) – Graham Nash
"Cathedral" (Previously unreleased mix) – Crosby, Stills & Nash
"Barrel of Pain (Half-Life)" – Graham Nash
"Magical Child" (Previously unreleased mix) – Graham Nash
"Song for Susan" – Crosby, Stills & Nash
"Wasted on the Way" – Crosby, Stills & Nash
"Love Is the Reason" (Previously unreleased mix) – Graham Nash
"Raise a Voice" – Crosby, Stills & Nash
"Clear Blue Skies" (Previously unreleased version) – Crosby, Stills & Nash
"Lonely Man" (Previously unreleased song) – Crosby, Stills & Nash
"Sad Eyes" (Previously unreleased mix) – Graham Nash
"Water from the Moon" (Previously unreleased song) – Graham Nash
"Soldiers of Peace" – Crosby, Stills, Nash & Young

Disc three: 
"If Anybody Had a Heart" – Crosby, Stills & Nash
"Chippin’ Away" – Graham Nash
"After the Dolphin" – Crosby, Stills & Nash
"House of Broken Dreams" – Crosby, Stills & Nash
"Unequal Love" (live in Lennox, MA, 1993) – Graham Nash
"Liar's Nightmare" (live in Tampa, FL, 1993) – Graham Nash
"Heartland" (Previously unreleased mix) – Crosby, Stills, Nash & Young
"These Empty Days" – Crosby, Stills & Nash
"Try to Find Me" (Previously unreleased song) – Graham Nash
"Two Hearts" (Previously unreleased version) – Carole King & Graham Nash
"Behind the Shades" (Previously unreleased song) – Graham Nash
"Michael (Hedges Here)" (Previously unreleased version) – Graham Nash
"I Surrender" – Crosby/Nash
"Live On (The Wall)" – Crosby/Nash
"Dirty Little Secret" – Graham Nash
"We Breathe the Same Air" (Previously unreleased song) – Graham Nash
"Grace" – Crosby/Nash
"Jesus of Rio" – Crosby/Nash
"In Your Name" (Previously unreleased song) – Graham Nash

References

Graham Nash compilation albums
2009 compilation albums
Rhino Records compilation albums